The Nepalese ambassador to the Court of St James's in London is the official representative of the Government in Kathmandu to the Government of the United Kingdom. 
He is concurrently accredited to Dublin, Valletta and the International Maritime Organization. His office is in the Embassy of Nepal, London.

List of representatives

See also
Nepal–United Kingdom relations

References 

 
United Kingdom
Nepal